was a  after Ansei and before Bunkyū. This period spanned the years from March 1860 through February 1861.

Change of era
 March 18, 1860: The new era name was created to mark the destruction caused by a fire at Edo Castle and the assassination of Ii Naosuke (also known as "the disturbance" or "the incident" at the Sakurada-mon).  The previous era ended and a new one commenced in Ansei 7.

The new era name is derived from an hortatory aphorism to be found in The Book of the Later Han:  "With 100,000,000,000 descendants, your name will forever be recorded" (豊千億之子孫、歴万載而永延).

Events of the Man'en era
 1860 (Man'en 1): First Western professional photographer to establish residence in Japan, Orrin Freeman began living in Yokohama<ref>Hannavy, John. (2007). {{Google books|PJ8DHBay4_EC|Encyclopedia of Nineteenth-century Photography, Vol. 1, p. 770.|page=770}}</ref>
 1860 (Man'en 1): First foreign mission to the United States.

Gallery

See also
 Sesquicentennial of Japanese Embassy to the United States

Notes

References
 Nussbaum, Louis Frédéric and Käthe Roth. (2005). Japan Encyclopedia.'' Cambridge: Harvard University Press. ; OCLC 48943301
 Satow, Ernest Mason and Baba Bunyei. (1905).  Japan 1853-1864, Or, Genji Yume Monogatari. Tokyo: .

External links 
 National Diet Library, "The Japanese Calendar" Link to historical overview plus illustrative images from library's collection

Japanese eras
1860 in Japan
1861 in Japan
1860 introductions
1860 establishments in Japan
1860s disestablishments in Japan